The 2009 Calabasas Pro Tennis Championships was a professional tennis tournament played on outdoor hard courts. It was the ninth edition of the tournament which was part of the 2009 ATP Challenger Tour. It took place in Calabasas, California, United States between 19 and 25 October 2009.

ATP entrants

Seeds

 Rankings are as of October 12, 2009.

Other entrants
The following players received wildcards into the singles main draw:
  Prakash Amritraj
  Steve Johnson
  Bradley Klahn
  Gary Sacks

The following players received entry from the qualifying draw:
  Luka Gregorc
  Cecil Mamiit
  Louk Sorensen
  Fernando Vicente

Champions

Singles

 Donald Young def.  Michael Russell, 7–6(4), 6–1

Doubles

 Santiago González /  Simon Stadler def.  Treat Conrad Huey /  Harsh Mankad, 6–2, 5–7, [10–4]

External links
Official website
ITF Search 
2009 Draws

Calabasas Pro Tennis Championships
Calabasas Pro Tennis Championships
Tennis tournaments in the United States
Calabasas, California
Calabasas Pro Tennis Championships